
Year 816 (DCCCXVI) was a leap year starting on Tuesday (link will display the full calendar) of the Julian calendar.

Events 
 By place 
 Europe 
 October 5 – King Louis the Pious (son of Charlemagne) is crowned emperor of the Holy Roman Empire, by Pope Stephen IV at Reims. He also crowns the emperor's wife Ermengarde as Holy Roman Empress. The ceremony in Reims re-establishes the principle of papal supremacy, by recognising the importance of the pope in imperial coronations. Louis gives the pope many gifts, including the estate tax Vendeuvre, near Troyes (Northern France).
 Vikings raid Ireland at the Kingdom of Munster, at Inish Cathaigh.
 Battle of Pancorbo: A Moorish army from the Emirate of Córdoba is sent by Emir Al-Hakam I, to take control of the pass at Pancorbo. They defeat the army of Asturian-Basque Frankish vassals.
 Winter – The Basques, supported by the Moors, cross the Garonne River and revolt against the Franks in Gascony (north of the Pyrenees).

 Britain 
 King Hywel of Gwynedd is attacked by his brother Cynan on Anglesey (modern Wales), who is killed during the fighting (approximate date). 

 Abbasid Caliphate 
 Babak Khorramdin, Persian military leader, revolts against the Abbasid Caliphate in Azerbaijan (approximate date).

 By topic 
 Religion 
 Synod of Aachen: Louis the Pious calls for a council about the regulations (Institutio canonicorum Aquisgranensis) for monastic life in the Frankish Empire.
 Synod of Chelsea: King Coenwulf of Mercia calls for a council about his right to appoint abbots and monasteries in England.
 June 12 – Pope Leo III dies after a 20-year reign, and is succeeded by Pope Stephen IV as the 97th pope of Rome.

Births 
 Formosus, pope of the Catholic Church (approximate date)
 Henjō, Japanese waka poet (d. 890)

Deaths  
 June 12 – Leo III, pope of the Catholic Church (b. 750)
 October 28 – Beggo, count of Toulouse and Paris
 Cynan Dindaethwy, king of Gwynedd (Wales)
 Fātimah bint Mūsā, Muslim saint (b. 790)
 Harthama ibn A'yan, Muslim governor
 Hildoard, archbishop of Cambrai
 Li He, Chinese poet (b. 790)
 Empress Dowager Wang (Xianzong), Chinese empress
 Wulfar, archbishop of Reims

References